Førde Church is a parish church of the Church of Norway in Sunnfjord Municipality in Vestland county, Norway. It is located in the town of Førde. It is the church for the Førde parish which is part of the Sunnfjord prosti (deanery) in the Diocese of Bjørgvin. The white, wooden church was built in a long church design in 1885 using plans drawn up by the architect Jacob Wilhelm Nordan. The church seats about 475 people.

Building
Førde Church sits on a small hill overlooking the river Jølstra. Since then, the river has flowed almost  to the west instead. To the east, there is a pentagonal chancel with vestries on each side. The church has a large gallery, where an organ was installed when the church was new.

History
The earliest existing historical records of the church date back to the year 1327, but the church was not new at that time. The first church in Førde was likely a wooden stave church. Around 1620–1625, a new timber-framed nave was built adjacent to the old church and the existing medieval church was converted into the new chancel for the newly enlarged building.

In 1814, this church served as an election church. Together with more than 300 other parish churches across Norway, it was a polling station for elections to the 1814 Norwegian Constituent Assembly which wrote the Constitution of Norway. This was Norway's first national elections. Each church parish was a constituency that elected people called "electors" who later met together in each county to elect the representatives for the assembly that was to meet in Eidsvoll later that year.

In 1838, the church was torn down and replaced by a small timber-framed long church. In 1885, the church was torn down and a new wooden long church was built on the same site. It was designed by Jacob Wilhelm Nordan and the lead builder was Iver Løtvedt. The new church was consecrated on 1 October 1885 by the Bishop Fredrik Waldemar Hvoslef. In 1941–1951, the church was significantly renovated according to plans by Finn Bryn. During this renovation, the interior ceiling was rebuilt as flat instead of vaulted. The windows were replaced, the tower was rebuilt, and a new electrical lighting system was installed. In 1970 the sacristy was rebuilt and running water was installed. A new bathroom facility was built in 1975. A wheelchair entrance was built in 1983 and the church porch was renovated in 1985.

Media gallery

See also
List of churches in Bjørgvin

References

Sunnfjord
Churches in Vestland
Long churches in Norway
Wooden churches in Norway
19th-century Church of Norway church buildings
Churches completed in 1885
13th-century establishments in Norway
Norwegian election church